The BMW M67 was an automobile diesel engine, used in the BMW 7 Series. It was first introduced in 1998, and used until 2009. The engine is a common rail turbodiesel V8 design, using double overhead camshafts and 32 valves. It was the first luxury car application of a bi-turbo diesel intercooled V8 engine. The 4.0-litre iteration won the "3-4 L" category of the International Engine of the Year award in 1999 and again in 2000. It was replaced by the 6-cylinder N57 engine.

Summary

M67D40
The M67D40 was introduced in 1998.

Applications:
  at 4000 rpm,  at 2000 rpm, with a 4700 rpm redline.
 1998-2000 E38 740d
  at 4000 rpm,  at 1750-2500 rpm, with a 4700 rpm redline.
 1999 Z9 concept
 2000-2001 E38 740d

M67TUD40

The M67TUD40 was introduced in 2002. M67TUD40 is also known as M67TUD39.

Applications:
  at 4000 rpm,  at 1900-2500 rpm, with a 4700 rpm redline.
 2002-2005 E65 740d.
 2004 Siemens DuoCombino tram

M67D44

The M67D44 was introduced in 2005.

Applications:
  at 4000 rpm,  at 1750-2500 rpm, with a 4700 rpm redline.
 2005-2006 E65 LCI (facelift) 745d.

M67TUD44
The M67TUD44 was introduced in 2006.

Applications:
 at 4000 rpm,  at 1900-2500 rpm, with a 4700 rpm redline.
 2006-2009 E65 LCI (facelift) 745d.

References 

M67
Diesel engines by model

V8 engines